Antonio Leyza Sanchez (died March 27, 2021) was a Filipino politician who served as mayor of Calauan, Laguna from 1980 to 1986 and from 1988 to 1993. He is the convicted mastermind in the murders of Eileen Sarmenta and Allan Gomez, both students of the University of the Philippines, Los Baños (UPLB), in 1993.

Criminal career 

On the night of June 28, 1993, Eileen Sarmenta and Allan Gomez, students of the University of the Philippines, Los Baños (UPLB), were abducted at gunpoint by men working for Antonio Sanchez, the mayor of Calauan, Laguna. The students were brought to Sanchez's farm in Barangay Curba, where both were bound and gagged. Court records showed Sanchez's men also brought Gomez along "to avoid complications". The students were brought inside a resthouse, where Sarmenta was taken into Sanchez's room while Gomez was beaten by Luis Corcolon, Rogelio "Boy" Corcolon, Zoilo Ama and George Medialdea and thereafter thrown out of the resthouse.

Pepito Kawit struck Allan Gomez's diaphragm with the butt of an Armalite, causing Gomez to fall against a cement box. Brion thought Gomez was already dead, but Kawit said that his death would come later. Aurelio Centeno joined Sanchez's personal aides Edwin Cosico and Raul Alorico to watch television at the adjacent resthouse. Alorico told Centeno that Sanchez had been eagerly waiting for the group and worried that they would not arrive.

At around 1:00 a.m. the next day, a crying Sarmenta was dragged out of the resthouse by Luis and Medialdea, still bound and gagged and now stripped of her shorts. Sanchez, clad merely in a white polo shirt, appeared and thanked Luis and Medialdea for the gift. He is alleged to have stated: "I am through with her. She's all yours." When asked what would happen to Gomez, Medialdea assured the mayor that they would also kill him for full measure. The students were then loaded in a Tamaraw van by the appellants and headed for Calauan, followed closely by the ambulance. Kawit finished off Gomez with a single gunshot from his Armalite.

The men then stopped at a sugarcane field at Sitio Paputok, Mabacan, Calauan, and gang-raped Sarmenta. Kawit invited Centeno to join the assault, but Centeno refused as he could not, in conscience, bear the crime being committed. Despite Sarmenta's pleas to spare her life, Luis Corcolon fired his baby Armalite at her, and ordered Centeno to get rid of her body.

Following separate investigations by different law enforcement agencies, prosecutors pursued charges against Sanchez and his men, but did not include Teofilo "Kit" Alqueza, son of Gen. Dictador Alqueza, as respondents. Sanchez had claimed Alqueza was the mastermind behind the incident.

Conviction 
On March 14, 1995, Pasig Judge Harriet Demetriou concluded the 16-month Sarmenta-Gomez murder trial with the finding that Calauan Mayor Antonio Sanchez and several henchmen (only some of whom were policemen) were guilty of seven counts of rape with homicide for the rape and killing of Sarmenta and the killing of Sarmenta's friend. Demetriou, in her 132-page decision, described the crime as being borne out of "a plot seemingly hatched in hell".

Sanchez was serving seven counts of reclusión perpetua (40 years for each count) for the crimes until his death. On January 25, 1999, the Supreme Court of the Philippines affirmed the decision of the Regional Trial Court. On August 29, 1999, Sanchez was sentenced to two counts of reclusion perpetua by the Supreme Court for the murders of Nelson and Rickson Peñalosa.

Release order controversy 
A report by GMA News showed that Sanchez could have walked free in August 2019, according to a document bearing the signature of Bureau of Corrections director Nicanor Faeldon.

The document said the release order was for one Antonio Leyza Sanchez, "who was found to have served 40 years upon retroactive application of RA No. 10592 and was certified to have no other legal cause to be further detained, shall be released from confinement." RA 10592 is the law allowing convicts an early release based on good conduct time allowance (GCTA).

Sanchez's kin had said that they were informed about Sanchez's impending release, but public outrage prompted the government to review the GCTA law.

Death 
Sanchez was pronounced dead on arrival at the New Bilibid Prison Hospital on March 27, 2021.

Portrayal in popular culture 
Sanchez' case was the inspiration for the 1994 film Humanda Ka Mayor!: Bahala Na Ang Diyos. The film, produced by Regal Entertainment and Golden Lions Productions, is based on Mayor Sanchez's account and criminal activities (with his name in the film changed to "Mayor Miguel Beltran").

Footnotes

References

External links
Mayor Sanchez et al. Verdict
Martin Andanar on the Mayor Antonio Sanchez Case

1946 births
2021 deaths
Filipino rapists
20th-century criminals
21st-century criminals
Mayors of places in Laguna (province)
People from Laguna (province)
Filipinos convicted of murder
Filipino prisoners sentenced to life imprisonment
People convicted of murder by the Philippines
Prisoners sentenced to life imprisonment by the Philippines
Politicians convicted of sex offences
Politicians convicted of murder
Filipino politicians convicted of crimes
Filipino people who died in prison custody
Prisoners who died in Philippine detention